This is a list of the National Register of Historic Places listings in Gallatin County, Montana.

This is intended to be a complete list of the properties and districts on the National Register of Historic Places in Gallatin County, Montana, United States. The locations of National Register properties and districts for which the latitude and longitude coordinates are included below, may be seen in a map.

There are 107 properties and districts listed on the National Register in the county, including 1 National Historic Landmark.

Current listings

|}

See also

 List of National Historic Landmarks in Montana
 National Register of Historic Places listings in Montana

References

Gallatin County, Montana
Gallatin